Sexiled, short for , is a Japanese yuri light novel series, written by Kaeruda Ameko and illustrated by Mitsuya Kazutomo. It was serialized online between August 2018 and April 2019 on the user-generated novel publishing website Shōsetsuka ni Narō. It was acquired by Overlap, who published both volumes of the light novel in 2019 under their Overlap Novels imprint. It is licensed in North America by J-Novel Club. A manga adaptation by Seto Ririura began serialization on Shogakukan's Sunday Webry manga website on April 12, 2021.

Synopsis
Tanya Artemiciov is a talented Mage adventurer who is kicked from her party by its sexist leader. Upset by this turn out events, Tanya goes to the wasteland to blow off some steam, however in the process she inadvertently frees a mythical Sorceress named Laplace who has been sealed away for 300 years. The two decide to work together so that Tanya can get her revenge on her old party by beating them in the upcoming adventurer tournament.

Media

Light novels
J-Novel Club first announced it had licensed Sexiled in North America for a digital release in August 2019, However, on November 16, 2019 during J-Novel Club's Anime NYC panel, it was announced that they would also be releasing print editions of Sexiled and My Next Life as a Villainess: All Routes Lead to Doom!. The light novel was inspired by the manipulation of test scores at Tokyo Medical University, which was brought to light in August 2018, where in it was revealed that the university had deliberately lowered entrance exam scores of female applicants by 10-20% in order to keep the number of female students below 30%.

Manga
A manga adaptation by Seto Ririura began serialization on Shogakukan's Sunday Webry manga website on April 12, 2021.

Reception
Sexiled has received positive reviews, with Kim Morrissy from Anime News Network giving it the series an overall A grade. Morrissy praised its "Breezy prose, witty dialogue, a fun yet deeply honest look at gender discrimination issues". Erica Friedman of Yuricon noted in her review that while the revenge aspect of the plot is satisfying, "What made this book so wonderful was the humor, the teamwork, the humanity of it."

The series has been featured on BookWalker's top-selling light novels for 2019 and 2020.

References

External links

2010s LGBT literature
2019 Japanese novels
J-Novel Club books
Japanese webcomics
Light novels
Light novels first published online
Novels about misogyny
Shogakukan manga
Shōnen manga
Shōsetsuka ni Narō
Yuri (genre) anime and manga
Yuri (genre) light novels